The meridian 80° west of Greenwich is a line of longitude that extends from the North Pole across the Arctic Ocean, North America, the Atlantic Ocean, the Caribbean Sea, Panama, South America, the Pacific Ocean, the Southern Ocean, and Antarctica to the South Pole.

In Antarctica, the meridian defines the western limit of the British territorial claim and passes through the Chilean claim - the two claims overlap.

The 80th meridian west forms a great circle with the 100th meridian east.

From Pole to Pole
Starting at the North Pole and heading south to the South Pole, the 80th meridian west passes through:

{| class="wikitable plainrowheaders"
! scope="col" width="120" | Co-ordinates
! scope="col" | Country, territory or sea
! scope="col" | Notes
|-
| style="background:#b0e0e6;" | 
! scope="row" style="background:#b0e0e6;" | Arctic Ocean
| style="background:#b0e0e6;" |
|-
| 
! scope="row" | 
| Nunavut — Ellesmere Island
|-valign="top"
| style="background:#b0e0e6;" | 
! scope="row" style="background:#b0e0e6;" | Jones Sound
| style="background:#b0e0e6;" | Passing just west of Coburg Island, Nunavut,  (at )
|-
| 
! scope="row" | 
| Nunavut — Devon Island and Philpots Island
|-
| style="background:#b0e0e6;" | 
! scope="row" style="background:#b0e0e6;" | Baffin Bay
| style="background:#b0e0e6;" |
|-
| 
! scope="row" | 
| Nunavut — Bylot Island
|-
| style="background:#b0e0e6;" | 
! scope="row" style="background:#b0e0e6;" | Eclipse Sound
| style="background:#b0e0e6;" |
|-
| 
! scope="row" | 
| Nunavut — Imiliit and Baffin Island
|-
| style="background:#b0e0e6;" | 
! scope="row" style="background:#b0e0e6;" | Murray Maxwell Bay
| style="background:#b0e0e6;" |
|-
| 
! scope="row" | 
| Nunavut — Kapuiviit
|-
| style="background:#b0e0e6;" | 
! scope="row" style="background:#b0e0e6;" | Foxe Basin
| style="background:#b0e0e6;" |
|-valign="top"
| style="background:#b0e0e6;" | 
! scope="row" style="background:#b0e0e6;" | Foxe Channel
| style="background:#b0e0e6;" | Passing just east of Southampton Island, Nunavut,  (at )
|-
| style="background:#b0e0e6;" | 
! scope="row" style="background:#b0e0e6;" | Hudson Bay
| style="background:#b0e0e6;" |
|-
| 
! scope="row" | 
| Nunavut — Mansel Island
|-
| style="background:#b0e0e6;" | 
! scope="row" style="background:#b0e0e6;" | Hudson Bay
| style="background:#b0e0e6;" |
|-
| 
! scope="row" | 
| Nunavut — Gilmour Island
|-
| style="background:#b0e0e6;" | 
! scope="row" style="background:#b0e0e6;" | Hudson Bay
| style="background:#b0e0e6;" | Passing just west of Split Island, Nunavut, 
|-
| 
! scope="row" | 
| Nunavut — Kugong Island and Flaherty Island
|-
| style="background:#b0e0e6;" | 
! scope="row" style="background:#b0e0e6;" | Hudson Bay
| style="background:#b0e0e6;" |
|-
| style="background:#b0e0e6;" | 
! scope="row" style="background:#b0e0e6;" | James Bay
| style="background:#b0e0e6;" |
|-
| 
! scope="row" | 
| Nunavut — North Twin Island
|-
| style="background:#b0e0e6;" | 
! scope="row" style="background:#b0e0e6;" | James Bay
| style="background:#b0e0e6;" | Passing just west of South Twin Island, Nunavut,  (at )
|-
| 
! scope="row" | 
| Ontario
|-
| style="background:#b0e0e6;" | 
! scope="row" style="background:#b0e0e6;" | Lake Erie
| style="background:#b0e0e6;" |
|-valign="top"
| 
! scope="row" | 
|-valign="top"
| style="background:#b0e0e6;" | 
! scope="row" style="background:#b0e0e6;" | Atlantic Ocean
| style="background:#b0e0e6;" | Passing just east of Palm Beach, Florida,  (at ) Passing through the Cay Sal Bank atoll,  (at )
|-
| 
! scope="row" | 
|
|-
| style="background:#b0e0e6;" | 
! scope="row" style="background:#b0e0e6;" | Caribbean Sea
| style="background:#b0e0e6;" |
|-
| 
! scope="row" | 
| Island of Little Cayman
|-
| style="background:#b0e0e6;" | 
! scope="row" style="background:#b0e0e6;" | Caribbean Sea
| style="background:#b0e0e6;" |
|-
| 
! scope="row" | 
|
|-
| style="background:#b0e0e6;" | 
! scope="row" style="background:#b0e0e6;" | Gulf of Panama
| style="background:#b0e0e6;" |
|-
| 
! scope="row" | 
| Passing through the tip of the Azuero Peninsula
|-
| style="background:#b0e0e6;" | 
! scope="row" style="background:#b0e0e6;" | Pacific Ocean
| style="background:#b0e0e6;" |
|-
| 
! scope="row" | 
| The mainland, Puná Island, and the mainland again
|-valign="top"
| 
! scope="row" | 
| Piura Region Lambayeque Region — from 
|-valign="top"
| style="background:#b0e0e6;" | 
! scope="row" style="background:#b0e0e6;" | Pacific Ocean
| style="background:#b0e0e6;" | Passing close between the Desventuradas Islands,  (at ) Passing some distance between the Juan Fernández Islands,  (at )
|-
| style="background:#b0e0e6;" | 
! scope="row" style="background:#b0e0e6;" | Southern Ocean
| style="background:#b0e0e6;" |
|-valign="top"
| 
! scope="row" | Antarctica
| Defines the western limit of British Antarctic Territory, claimed by  Passes through Antártica Chilena Province, claimed by 
|-
|}

See also
79th meridian west
81st meridian west

References 

w080 meridian west
Borders of the United Kingdom